Rajakaruna Mohotti Appuhamillage Harshana Supun Rajakaruna (known as Harshana Rajakaruna born 27 February 1980) is a Sri Lankan politician. He is a Member of the Sri Lankan Parliament from the United National Party and a former member of the Western Provincial Council.

Born to Sarathchandra Rajakaruna, Harshana was educated at Royal College, Colombo, played cricket for the college at the Royal–Thomian. He went on to gain a degree in management from the University of Nottingham and a MBA from the University of Wales, Cardiff. On his return to Sri Lanka he worked at John Keells Stock Brokers as a Senior Investment Advisor.

He was a member of the executive committee, National Youth League Working Committee, Sports Committee, Economic Committee and Buddhist Committee of the United National Party. In 2009 he contest the provincial council election and won a seat in the Western Province Provincial Council.

He was elected to parliament during the 2015 elections.

He contested the 2020 General Elections under the Samagi Jana Balawegaya (සමගි ජන බලවේගය) party. He obtained the 3rd highest number of preferential votes for the SJB in the Gampaha electoral district.

References

External links
 

1980 births
Living people
Sri Lankan Buddhists
Samagi Jana Balawegaya politicians
United National Party politicians
Members of the 15th Parliament of Sri Lanka
Members of the 16th Parliament of Sri Lanka
Provincial councillors of Sri Lanka
Alumni of Royal College, Colombo
Sinhalese politicians